Halsey Brook converges with East Kill near East Jewett.

References 

Rivers of New York (state)
Rivers of Greene County, New York